Rudra: The Edge of Darkness is an Indian psychological crime thriller streaming television series, created for Disney+ Hotstar. It's a remake of British series Luther. The series stars Ajay Devgn, Raashii Khanna and Esha Deol.

Premise
DCP Rudraveer Pratap Singh "Rudra" (Ajay Devgn) is pursuing a suspect who ends up in a comatose state in the hospital. After an inquiry into what happened, he is reinstated in the force months later, but the time apart has taken its toll on him.

Cast
 Ajay Devgn as DCP Rudraveer Pratap Singh (Rudra) 
 Raashii Khanna as Dr. Aliyah Choksi
 Esha Deol as Shaila Durrani Singh "Shai"
 Atul Kulkarni as DCP Gautam Navlakha
 Ashwini Kalsekar as Jt. Commissioner Deepali Handa
 Tarun Gahlot as P. I. Prabal Thakur
 Ashish Vidyarthi as Jt. CP Raman Acharya 
 Rajiv Kachroo as Mandar Naik
 Milind Gunaji as Colonel Yashwant Nikose
 Luke Kenny as JK Lamba
 Vikram Singh Chauhan as Captain Ashok Nikose
 K. C. Shankar as Anil Sharma (Fake Name) / Siddheshwar Kumar
 Satyadeep Misra as Rajiv Dattani
 Saad Chaudhary as SCU Officer
 Rajesh Jais as Commissioner
 Vishwanath Kulkarni as Inspector Shivaji Memane

Episodes

Production 
In April 2019, Applause Entertainment acquired the rights to remake the hit BBC One's drama series Luther.  In April 2021, Disney+ Hotstar formally announced the show attaching Devgn to star in the lead role with Applause Entertainment and BBC Studios India producing.

Casting 
In April 2021, reports came in stating that Ajay Devgn will star in the Indian adaptation  and the same was confirmed later that month with the series order from Disney+ Hotstar. In July 2021, Esha Deol was cast as the female lead. Later that month, Raashi Khanna, Atul Kulkarni, Ashwini Kalsekar and Ashish Vidyarthi joined the cast. In January 2022, Satyadeep Mishra and Tarun Gahlot were confirmed to be cast in main roles.

Release 
The six episode first season premiered on 4 March 2022 on Disney+ Hotstar. In US, the show will be available on Hulu as part of distribution agreements with Star India.

References

External links
 

Hindi-language Disney+ Hotstar original programming
Indian drama television series
Indian legal television series
Indian television series based on British television series
Luther (TV series)
Hindi-language television shows
Television shows set in Mumbai